Photograph is an album released by American singer Melanie in 1976, her only release on Atlantic Records. The album contains "Cyclone" which was released as a single. Despite making a publicity tour on American Bandstand and The Brady Bunch Hour to promote the single, it failed to chart in America.

Ahmet Ertegün, who had signed Melanie to his label, was credited with creative direction on the album, was involved with the album's recording, and present at all vocal sessions and mixes.

The album was heralded by The New York Times as "one of the finest pop albums of the year." In their review, Cash Box magazine referred to Melanie as "one of our best  folk-rock stylists" and that she was "surrounded by excellent instrumental tracks" on the album and that "there is not a weak song in the package." Billboard magazine singled out "Cyclone" as "the most powerful vocally and lyrically and one of the best songs she's ever recorded." AllMusic noted that the album was "very much Melanie's own victory - her material was a revelation, and more sophisticated than anything she'd ever accomplished before."

The album went largely unnoticed by the public. The album was only released in the United States, Australia and New Zealand. For reasons unknown, Atlantic Records pulled the album from distribution shortly after its release.

The album was reissued by Rhino Records in 2005 as an individually numbered limited edition of 3,500 copies. The reissue contained a remastered version of the album plus a second disc of tracks recorded during the same sessions.

Track listing
All songs written by Melanie Safka, except where noted.
"Cyclone"
"If I Needed You"
"The Letter" (Wayne Carson Thompson)
"Groundhog Day"
"Nickel Song / Music! Music! Music!" (Stephan Weiss, Bernie Baum)
"Photograph"
"I'm So Blue"
"Secret of the Darkness (I Believe)"
"Save Me"
"Raindance"
"Friends and Company"

2005 CD reissue

The 2005 CD reissue, Photograph (Double Exposure), contained a bonus disc of material recorded during the Atlantic sessions:

"Groundhog Day" (Alternate Version)
"Cyclone" (Alternate Version)
"Secret of the Darkness (I Believe), Pt. 1"
"Secret of the Darkness (I Believe), Pt. 2"
"Unfinished Business" (Selma Version)
"Whamp Bhomp Song"
"Ruby Tuesday" (Mick Jagger, Keith Richards)
"Love to Live Again"
"Here We Go Again"
"Jukebox Magazine"
"Miranda" (Phil Ochs)
"Unfinished Business" (West Version)
"Remember Me Good"
"Over the Rainbow" (Harold Arlen, E.Y. Harburg)

All songs written by Melanie Safka except where noted

Personnel
Melanie - guitar, vocals
Dave Doran - guitar, vocals
Dean Parks, Louie Shelton - guitar
David Jackson, Jerry Scheff, Jay Wolfe - bass
David Paich, Jim Drennan - keyboards
Jeff Porcaro - drums, vocals
Jim Gordon, John Guerin - drums
Milt Holland, Victor Feldman - percussion
Angelo Mauceri - percussion, vocals
Richard Greene - violin
Carol Parks, Denny Bell, Edwin Hawkins Singers, Jay Wolfe - backing vocals
David Campbell - arrangements, viola on "Photograph"
Art Pepper - saxophone on "I'm So Blue"
Robin Williamson - mandolin on "Raindance"
Marty Paich - arrangements

Charts

References

External links
 Original Atlantic press release

1976 albums
Melanie (singer) albums
Albums arranged by Marty Paich
Albums arranged by David Campbell (composer)
Atlantic Records albums